Norbu is a brand of sugar substitute containing monk fruit extract and erythritol, marketed as a sweetener for beverages, baking, and cooking. Norbu sweetener was launched in Coles Supermarkets and Woolworths Supermarkets in 2013.

Composition
Monk fruit extract has been developed as a sweetener for food and beverages. Though the monk fruit contains carbohydrates such as fructose and glucose, Norbu is made only from the extracted mogrosides of the monk fruit. Norbu also contains erythritol as a sweetener with a binding and filling agent.

References

Sugar substitutes